The War on the Shore is the annual Men's Lacrosse game between rivals Washington College and Salisbury University. This game is nicknamed "The War on the Shore" because they are two major colleges on the eastern shore of Maryland and the close proximity creates a natural rivalry between the schools. This Division III game is played every spring and is considered one of the most anticipated games of the year in lacrosse.

Charles Branch Clark, a 1934 graduate of Washington College and lacrosse coach at both schools, has been called the "tie binding the lacrosse traditions of both schools." After Clark's passing in December 2003, the Charles B. Clark cup was named in his honor and has since been awarded annually to the winner of the war on the Shore. The game between these two teams draws several thousand fans each year earning this game the title "The Biggest Little Lacrosse Game in America."

The Shoremen and Sea Gulls have faced off 53 times, with Salisbury leading the overall series 33-20, since the series began in 1974, including 10 times in the NCAA Division III Men's Lacrosse Championship. The competition did not occur in 2020 or 2021 amid both universities closing for the COVID-19 pandemic, but returned in 2022.

From 2002 to 2012, the Sea Gulls of Salisbury had won 10 straight games over the Shoremen of Washington until the Shoremen broke the streak with a 7-6 victory in 2013. Each game is played either at Roy Kirby Stadium on the campus of Washington College or Sea Gull Stadium on the campus of Salisbury University.

Game results

References

College lacrosse rivalries in the United States
Washington College Shoremen lacrosse
Salisbury Sea Gulls men's lacrosse